Ida Theilade is a Danish botanist. She is a professor of at the University of Copenhagen.

Education
Theilade has a PhD in tropical botany from the University of Copenhagen.

Ida Theilade is chair of the board of the International Work Group for Indigenous Affairs. She is a member of the IUCN Species Survival Commission on threatened trees.

References

21st-century Danish botanists
Living people
University of Copenhagen alumni
Academic staff of the University of Copenhagen
Year of birth missing (living people)

Danish women botanists